Connaraceae is a pan-tropical plant family of 19 genera and more than 180 species of largely evergreen trees, woody shrubs and climbers.

The family was first described by Robert Brown in 1816 and the name has been conserved.

Distribution
Connaraceae is a tropical family, the most important genera of which, Connarus (approximately 80 species) and Rourea (40-70 species) have a pan-tropical distribution. Their habitat is generally lowland tropical rain forest and savanna.

Description
Connaraceae are typically evergreen trees, shrubs or climbers.  Connarus is represented by species in all three lifeforms, while Rourea species are climbers. Their leaves are pinnate, trifoliate or rarely entire, alternate, without stipules and with a pulvinus at the base of the petiole. 

Connarus guianensis is economically important for its decorative wood, zebra wood.

Genera

Fossil record
Fossil leaflet impression described as Rourea miocaudata  from India shows close resemblance to leaflets of the extant Rourea caudata, it has been recorded from the lower part of the Siwalik sediments (Dafla Formation, middle–upper Miocene) of Pinjoli area in West Kameng district, Arunachal Pradesh. Permineralized wood of a stem with the distinctive anatomy of a liana has been described with fossil fruits from a locality in the lower Miocene (19 mya) Cucaracha Formation, where the formation is exposed by the Culebra Cut of the Panama Canal. The anatomy of this fossil wood matches the genus Rourea. Fossil record of Connaraceae is sparse, reliable occurrences indicate that the family originated as early as the late Cretaceous-Paleocene and was widespread by the early Miocene.

References

External links
 Family Connaraceae
 Information about Oxalidales - Angiosperm Phylogeny Website

 
Rosid families
Taxa named by Robert Brown (botanist, born 1773)